Go Get It is a compilation album by R&B/Gospel duo Mary Mary containing songs from their albums Thankful, Incredible, Mary Mary, The Sound, and Something Big, also containing some new songs including the single "Go Get It" and remixed and remastered hits was released on May 8, 2012. The album debuted at number ten on the Billboard 200, giving Mary Mary their third top ten album in the US; with first week sales of 18,946 units.
"Sunday Morning" was the second single to be released.

Track listing

Personnel 
Credits are source and adapted from allmusic.com.

Artist	Credit
Damien Alexander	 A&R, Operation
GooGoo Atkins	 Stylist, Vocals (Background)
Shanaté Atkins	 Vocals (Background)
Charlie Bereal	 Composer, Producer, Various Instruments
Little Charlie Bereal	 Guitar
Adam Blackstone	 Bass
Derek Blanks	 Photography
Noa Bolozky	 Hair Stylist, Make-Up
Chandler Bridges	 Assistant, Mixing Engineer
Bruce Buechner	 Engineer, Mixing
Curtis Burrell	 Composer
Eric Campbell	 Vocals (Background)
Erica Campbell	 Composer, Vocals (Background)
Sandra Campbell	 Project Coordinator
Tina Campbell	 Composer, Vocals (Background)
Warryn Campbell	 Arranger, Composer, Drums, Executive Producer, Keyboards, Mixing, Producer, Programmer, Programming, Various Instruments, Vocal Arrangement, Vocals (Background)
Wayne Campbell	 Executive Producer
Curt Chambers	 Guitar
Rob Chiarelli	 Mixing
Fusako Chubachi	 Package Design
Naima Cochrane	 Marketing
Neal Conway	 Composer
Dean Cooper	 Sound Design
Sean Cooper	 Engineer
Kenneth Crear	 Executive Producer
AJ Crimson	 Make-Up
Kevin Crouse	 Engineer
James Cruz	 Mastering
LaShawn Daniels	 Composer
Justin Davidson	 Imaging
Destiny's Child	 Featured Artist, Vocals (Background)
Devin Webster	 Drums
DJ Babey Drew	 Scratching
DJ Reflex	 Scratching
Jan Fairchild	 Engineer
Fats	 Rap
Paul Foley	 Engineer
Kirk Franklin	 Featured Artist
Norman Gregg	 Composer
Jean-Marie Horvat	 Mixing
Allen Jeffries	 Engineer
Anthony Jeffries	 Engineer
Rodney Jerkins	 Composer, Mixing, Producer, Rap
Meaghan Lyons	 A&R, Operation
Fabian Marasciullo	 Engineer
Manny Marroquin	 Mixing
Mary Mary	 Executive Producer, Primary Artist, Vocal Arrangement, Vocals (Background)
Curtis Mayfield	 Composer
Darrell Miller	 Legal Counsel
Kim Mimble	 Hair Stylist
Peter Mokran	 Mixing
Tyrone Murray	 Marketing Consultant
Kayla Parker	 Vocal Arrangement, Vocals
Nora Payne	 Composer, Vocals (Background)
Isaac Phillips	 Guitar
Poke & Tone	 Executive Producer, Producer
Milka Prica	 Stylist
Jared Robbins	 Mixing
Bola Sete	 Composer
Kierra "KiKi" Sheard	 Featured Artist
John Jubu Smith	 Composer, Guitar
Richard "Tubbs" Smith	 Keyboards
Vindell Smith	 Guitar
Mitchell Solarek	 Management
Tanner Underwood	 Assistant
Dylan Vaughan	 Assistant Engineer, Mixing
Seth Waldmann	 Mixing
Eric Walls	 Guitar
Crystal Waters	 Composer
Dontae Winslow	 Horn

Chart performance

Weekly charts

Year-end charts

References 

Mary Mary compilation albums
2012 compilation albums
Albums produced by Warryn Campbell
Columbia Records compilation albums
Electronica compilation albums